Semi-Tough is a 1977 American sports comedy film directed by Michael Ritchie and starring Burt Reynolds, Kris Kristofferson, Jill Clayburgh, Robert Preston, Lotte Lenya, and Bert Convy. It is set in the world of American professional football.

The plot involves a love triangle between the characters portrayed by Reynolds, Kristofferson, and Clayburgh.  Semi-Tough also includes a parody of Werner Erhard's Erhard Seminars Training (est), depicted in the film as an organization called "B.E.A.T.".

The film is based on the 1972 novel of the same name by Dan Jenkins. It was adapted for the screen by writer Walter Bernstein and director Ritchie, who added a new storyline that included a satire of the self-help movement and new religions.

Semi-Tough follows the story of pro football friends Billy Clyde Puckett and Marvin "Shake" Tiller, who have a third roommate, Barbara Jane Bookman.  A romance develops between Shake and Barbara Jane when he becomes self-confident after completing a self awareness course called "B.E.A.T.", at which point Billy Clyde slyly makes a play to win her for himself.

The film received mixed receptions.  Some reviewers praised its parodies of the est training, Erhard and other new age movements such as Rolfing.  Others criticized the script and direction, noting that some of director Ritchie's previous films had more of a personal tone.  Still other reviews lamented the film's departure from the novel Semi-Tough, which dealt with football rather than the new age movement.

Plot
Wide receiver Marvin "Shake" Tiller and running back Billy Clyde Puckett are  football buddies who play for a Miami pro team owned by Big Ed Bookman (Preston).  Bookman's daughter Barbara Jane is roommates with both men, and the film depicts a subtle love triangle relationship between Barbara Jane and her two friends.  She initially has romantic feelings for Shake, who has become more self-confident after taking self-improvement training from seminar leader Friedrich Bismark. The program is called Bismark Energy Action Training, or B.E.A.T.  After Shake completes his course,  Barbara Jane and he have sex and start a relationship.  Barbara Jane is not a follower of B.E.A.T., and Shake is warned by his leader Bismark that "mixed marriages don't work".

Barbara Jane is determined to make it work, so she attends B.E.A.T. in an effort to "get it". At the end of the training session, she is worn out from Bismark's "sadistic abuse, pious drivel, and sheer double talk".  Barbara Jane also feels guilty that she did not "get it".  Shake is insistent that the training has had proven results for him, noting that he has not dropped a football pass since completing B.E.A.T.  Billy Clyde also has feelings for Barbara Jane and enrolls in B.E.A.T.  to understand what she is going through.  In the training, Billy Clyde is shown coping with the seminar rules forbidding going to the bathroom.  For a time, Puckett pretends he underwent a conversion to Bismark's way of thinking.  While Barbara Jane and Shake are at the altar about to be married, the minister turns to Bismark and gives him some advice on how he can avoid capital gains tax in his business.  Billy Clyde ends up exposing the movement's shallow side, and rescues Barbara Jane from both B.E.A.T. and her impending marriage to Shake.  After leaving the wedding together, Barbara Jane and Billy Clyde reveal their feelings for each other.

Cast

 Burt Reynolds as Billy Clyde Puckett
 Kris Kristofferson as Marvin "Shake" Tiller
 Jill Clayburgh as Barbara Jane Bookman
 Robert Preston as Big Ed Bookman
 Bert Convy as Friedrich Bismark
 Roger E. Mosley as Puddin Patterson Sr.
 Lotte Lenya as Clara Pelf
 Richard Masur as Phillip Hooper
 Carl Weathers as Dreamer Tatum
 Brian Dennehy as T.J. Lambert
 Mary Jo Catlett as Earlene Emery
 Joe Kapp as Hose Manning
 Ron Silver as Vlada Kostov
 Jim McKrell as Bud McNair
 Peter Bromilow as Kostov's Interpreter
 Norman Alden as Coach Alvin Parks

Production

Adaptation
Semi-Tough is based on the best-selling novel of the same name by Dan Jenkins, and the screenplay was written by Walter Bernstein.  Bernstein and director Michael Ritchie used parts of Jenkins's novel and added parodies of self-help groups, new religions, and the Human Potential Movement.  Ritchie was partially influenced by Adam Smith's book, Powers of Mind.  Though the screenplay altered his original work, Dan Jenkins wrote that Semi-Tough "wasn't a horrible movie in my opinion".  Jenkins later commented that the film adaptation of his book Baja Oklahoma  was: "a lot more faithful to the novel than Semi-Tough ever was".

Preparation
Burt Reynolds began training with Kris Kristofferson to get in shape before film production.  Before work began on the film, actor Bert Convy attended one of Werner Erhard's est training sessions to prepare for his role as B.E.A.T. seminar leader Friedrich Bismark.  Pro football stars were hired to give realism to the film, including John Matuszak, Paul Hornung, Joe Kapp, and Ed "Too Tall" Jones.  The football scenes were shot at the Cotton Bowl.

Parodies of self-improvement, new religions 
Bernstein and Ritchie's modified screenplay based on Jenkins' book includes a storyline with "satiric jabs" at new religions, self-improvement, and the Human Potential Movement.  A form of Rolfing is also parodied in the film by Lotte Lenya, whose character Clara Pelf is seen as a spoof of "a Rolf-like masseuse".  Big Ed Bookman is seen crawling around on all fours practicing something called "creep therapy" or "movagenics".  Movagenics is seen in the film as a way for individuals to find their "lost center of consciousness".  Big Ed Bookman is also shown proselytizing for "Movagenics", a fictional group in the film which TIME referred to in its review as both a cult and a new faith.

The film includes a parody with B.E.A.T. as a stand-in for  est .  In American Film Now, Friedrich Bismark is simply described as "the Werner Erhard character".  The Grove Book of Hollywood describes Bert Convy as a "Werner Erhard-lookalike", in his portrayal of Friedrich Bismark.  Barbara Jane Bookman's guilty feelings for not "getting it" after completing her B.E.A.T. seminar are seen as a reference to: "how creeds like est put nonbelievers on the defensive".  The book also notes: "The film captures the peculiar mixture of spirituality and pragmatism that surrounded est", and also describes the minister's capital gains tax advice to Friedrich Bismark at Shake's wedding as "sardonic".  A 1977 review in TIME refers to Friedrich Bismark's B.E.A.T. as "an est-like movement", and notes: "the Ritchie-Bernstein version of an est seminar is done with marvelous malice".  Psychiatry and the Cinema characterizes the film as a "devastating parody" of the est training.

After Semi-Tough'''s release in 1977, Bert Convy was contacted by a number of est followers, as well as by Werner Erhard.  After Convy appeared on The Tonight Show and discussed his experiences attending Erhard Seminars Training in preparation for his role as Friedrich Bismark, he received a letter from Erhard stating: "it would be great for us to get together".  Of the est seminar itself, Convy recalled that when another attendee complained of a headache during the course, the group leader told him to "experience it", and when another attendee wet his pants, he was told to "experience the warmth".  In a scene from the film, a woman exclaims to Friedrich Bismark in the middle of a seminar: "I peed in my pants and it felt good."  During actual filming on Semi-Tough, Convy received a late-night phone call from actress Valerie Harper, known in Hollywood as a devoted student of Werner Erhard.  She related to Convy that Erhard was "pleased" with the role, and she wished him success in the film.  Convy suspected that her real reason for calling was to subtly pressure him to go easy on his parody of Erhard in the film. Harper is mentioned by name in the completed film.

Reception

Box office and releases
The film grossed $37,187,139 at the box office. Semi-Tough was later developed as a short-lived television series with a similar theme, and was a candidate to be picked up in the fall of 1980.Hasselhoff, David.  Don't Hassel the Hoff: The Autobiography. New York: St. Martin's P, 2007. Web. 23 Aug. 2022.  The 1980 series starred Bruce McGill playing Burt Reynolds' original role, with co-star David Hasselhoff.P. Laurence, R. (2006, October 2). NETWORK GUILTY OF PILING ON. San Diego Union-Tribune, The (CA), pp. D-1. Available from NewsBank: Access World News: https://infoweb-newsbank-com.ccclez.idm.oclc.org/apps/news/document-view?p=AWNB&docref=news/1148EA9065EF1EE0.  The film has since been released in both VHS and DVD formats.

Awards
In 1978, Walter Bernstein received a nomination for a WGA Award from the Writers Guild of America in the "Best Comedy Adapted from Another Medium" category, for his adaptation of Dan Jenkins' novel.

Critical reception

The press disagreed on the satire of Erhard in the film, some praising it, some not.  The Wall Street Journal criticized the film, save for its satirical nature: "The movie isn't much - an erratic ramble - but it has some pleasant moments, and a delicious send-up of the self-improvement guru Werner Erhard."  The Charlotte Observer praised Bert Convy's portrayal of the self-help guru Frederick Bismark, and called Convy: "… a hilariously smug consciousness-raiser with a more than passing resemblance to EST's [sic] Werner Erhard".  Magill's Survey of Cinema described the film as a chiding of American "religious fads and philosophies", and The Grove Book of Hollywood called it a "cheeky film" that poked fun at the "est" craze and other human potential fads.  TIME called the film one of 1977's best comedies, and also noted that it was: "without a doubt the year's most socially useful film".

The film did not receive a positive review in Variety, where the reviewer commented: "Semi-Tough begins as a bawdy and lively romantic comedy about slap-happy pro football players, then slows down to a too-inside putdown of contemporary self-help programs."  Variety noted that stars Burt Reynolds, Kris Kristofferson, and Jill Clayburgh were "excellent" within the "zigzag" script and poor direction they were given.  Michael Costello of Allmovie also criticized the script, and wrote: "While much of this is quite predictable, a number of the jokes score, Burt Reynolds works his charm overtime, and Jill Clayburgh and Kris Kristofferson are effective as comic foils."  In American Film Now, author James Monaco commented on director Michael Ritchie's directing style in Semi-Tough, stating that in the film Ritchie was "speaking in a professional voice".  Monaco noted that Ritchie's prior films evoked a more personal tone, and had more of a sense of wonder than Semi-Tough.

Chapman's In Search of Stupidity characterized the film as: "Possibly one of the best movies ever made by Burt Reynolds", and described the film's parody of est as accurate and amusing. Leonard Maltin criticized parts of the script, stating that Reynolds' charm filled in for the film's other deficiencies.  Hunsberger criticized Ritchie's screenplay adaptation in his work The Quintessential Dictionary, complaining that the game of football should have supported the film as a plot device, but was instead left to the side in favor of other stories.

See also
 Circle of Power''

References

External links
 
 
 

1977 films
1970s English-language films
1977 romantic comedy films
1970s sports comedy films
American buddy comedy films
American romantic comedy films
American football films
American satirical films
American sports comedy films
Films based on American novels
Films directed by Michael Ritchie
Films scored by Jerry Fielding
United Artists films
Films with screenplays by Ring Lardner Jr.
Films with screenplays by Walter Bernstein
1970s buddy comedy films
1970s American films